"Juice" is a song recorded by American singer and rapper Lizzo. It was released on January 4, 2019, by Atlantic Records as the lead single from her third and debut major-label studio album, Cuz I Love You. The single was written by Lizzo, Theron Thomas, Sam Sumser, Sean Small and Ricky Reed; the latter also handled the song's production. Musically, it is a retro-inspired funk and funk-pop song that is based on a throwback groove. Lyrically, the song discusses self-love, and has been described as a self-esteem anthem.

The song received widespread acclaim from critics, some of whom referred to the song as Lizzo's best. Commercially, the single entered component R&B charts in the United States, while also reaching the top twenty in Scotland. The track is certified Double Platinum in the US and Gold or Platinum in five additional countries. A music video was released alongside the single, which contains several 1980s pop culture references. To promote the single, Lizzo performed the song on several shows, including The Ellen DeGeneres Show, The Today Show, Jimmy Kimmel Live! and The Tonight Show Starring Jimmy Fallon.

The song is one of the tracks on the American version of Now That's What I Call Music! 71, released on August 2, 2019. In September 2019, the song spawned an internet meme after Polygon writer Jeff Ramos cut a trailer for House House's Untitled Goose Game using the song as its anthem. It was covered by Beth Ditto on the country music drama series Monarch.

Composition
"Juice" is a "bouncy", retro-inspired funk, funk-pop, and hip hop song with a heavy rap. Lizzo's delivery of the song has been described as "witty" and "full of fire". The single contains "midnight production" and a burnished throwback groove. It also has reverb-heavy guitar and "smug" spoken word. It contains "delightfully outrageous" lines such as "I be drippin' so much sauce / Got a bih lookin' like Ragu." The song lyrically talks about self-love, and has been described as a "self-esteem boosting anthem".

It is composed in the key of D minor. It has a chord progression of Dm - Eb/F - F/C - Bb - C

Critical reception
"Juice" received widespread acclaim from music critics upon release. Lollie King of Bustle wrote that the song "is sure to give you that much-needed confidence boost when you're feeling low." Christian Hoard, writing for Rolling Stone, praised the song as the singer's "finest" single to date, and called it "a near-perfect retro-funk nugget that would have felt just right on a mirror-balled dance floor in 1982." Joshua Bote, writing for NPR, stated that the song "continues [Lizzo's] winning streak of sing-songy, funk-heavy rap". Michael Roffman of Consequence of Sound wrote that the song "doubles as a jam and one of those dusty workout tapes you've got lying around your house." Pitchfork listed the song as the 53rd best of 2019. Billboard magazine ranked "Juice" 46th on their Best Songs of 2019 list, calling it "irresistibly immediate and durably relistenable".

Accolades
{| class="wikitable sortable plainrowheaders" style="width: 60%;"
|-
! scope="col" | Year
! scope="col" | Ceremony
! scope="col" | Category
! scope="col" | Result
! scope="col" class="unsortable"| 
|-
| rowspan="6"| 2019
| American Music Awards
| Favorite Song — Soul/R&B
| 
| style="text-align:center;"|
|-
| Q Awards
| Best Track
| 
| style="text-align:center;"|
|-
| rowspan="4"| Soul Train Music Awards
| Song of the Year
| 
| style="text-align:center;" rowspan="4"|
|-
| Video of the Year
| 
|-
| The Ashford and Simpson Songwriter's Award
| 
|- 
| Best Dance Performance
| 
|-
|2020
| Queerty Awards
| Anthem
| 
| style="text-align:center;"|
|-

Live performances
Lizzo performed the song on The Ellen DeGeneres Show, Today, Jimmy Kimmel Live! and The Tonight Show Starring Jimmy Fallon.

Music video
The music video for "Juice" was released the same day as the single. The video, directed by Quinn Wilson, features the singer in an '80s-style workout program, late-night talk show, and selling products on an infomercial. It also contains references to Soul Glo commercials and a reference to ASMR YouTuber Spirit Payton. Taylor Bryant of Nylon magazine described the video as "just as fun as the song".

A second music video premiered on the WOWPresents YouTube channel on April 17, 2019. The video features Lizzo with RuPaul's Drag Race alumni A'keria C. Davenport, Silky Nutmeg Ganache, Soju, Mayhem Miller, Asia O'Hara, Mariah Paris Balenciaga, Detox Icunt, Morgan McMichaels and Sonique. The video was directed by Pete Williams.

Plagiarism allegation
On October 18, 2019, singer CeCe Peniston accused Lizzo of plagiarizing the song's "Yeah-yeah" ad-lib from her 1990s single "Finally". Lizzo's lawyer rejected the claim, describing it as "opportunistic" and "specious".

Track listing
Digital download
 "Juice" – 3:15

Digital download — Breakbot Mix
 "Juice" (Breakbot Mix) – 2:52

Personnel
Adapted from Tidal.

Lizzo – lead artist, songwriter
Theron Thomas – songwriter, background vocals
Ricky Reed – songwriter, producer, guitar, keyboards, programming
Sam Sumser – songwriter
Sean Small – songwriter
Nate Mercereau – additional producer, guitar 
Asha Maura – background vocals
Quinn Wilson – background vocals
Shelby Swain – background vocals
Jesse McGinty – saxophone
Lemar Guillary – trombone
Michael Cordone – trumpet
Victor Indrizzo – percussion
Robin Florent – mixer
Manny Marroquin – mixer
Scott Desmarais – mixer
Chris Gehringer – masterer
Ethan Shumaker – engineer
Bill Malina – engineer
Rouble Kapoor – assistant engineer

Charts

Weekly charts

Year-end charts

Certifications

Release history

References

2019 singles
2019 songs
Funk songs
Lizzo songs
Atlantic Records singles
Songs involved in plagiarism controversies
Songs written by Ricky Reed
Songs written by Theron Thomas
Songs written by Lizzo
LGBT-related songs
Songs written by Sam Sumser
Songs written by Sean Small